Oslo Prison is the district prison of Oslo, Norway. It is the largest prison in Norway, with a capacity of around 350 detainees. The prison was called  until 2001. The prison has several departments. Department A is the former Botsfengselet, Grønlandsleiret 41, popularly called "Botsen". Department B is a former brewery located in Åkebergveien 11, popularly called "Bayer'n". Department C, called "Stifinner'n", is located in the former prison hospital at Åkebergveien, and is designated for prisoners with drug problems.

External links 
 Oslo Prison, homepage in English

References

Norwegian Correctional Services
Botsfengselet

Prisons in Norway
History of Oslo